KHBL-LP (96.9 FM) is a Low Power radio station licensed to serve Hannibal, Missouri.  The station is owned by KHBL, a not for profit corporation in Missouri. It airs a community radio format. The station's music programming includes a mix of music from the 1950s to the present.

The station was assigned the KHBL-LP call letters by the Federal Communications Commission on February 19, 2002.

See also
List of community radio stations in the United States

References

External links
KHBL-LP official website
 
KHBL-LP service area per the FCC database

HBL-LP
HBL-LP
Community radio stations in the United States
Radio stations established in 2003
Marion County, Missouri